Francis Doughty may refer to:

 Francis Doughty (clergyman) (1616–c. 1670), English-American Presbyterian minister
 Francis W. Doughty (1850–1917), American writer